Aethes semicircularis is a species of moth of the family Tortricidae. It is found in China (Henan, Jilin, Ningxia, Shaanxi, Shanxi).

The wingspan is 11−15 mm. The ground colour of the forewings is yellowish white, irregularly sprinkled with small brownish black spots or strigulae (fine streaks) at the costal margin. The hindwings are greyish brown.

Etymology
The species name refers to the semicircular anterior part of the vinculum and is derived from Latin semicircularis.

References

semicircularis
Moths described in 2013
Moths of Asia